The men's 800 metres competition at the 2002 Asian Games in Busan, South Korea was held on 8–9 October at the Busan Asiad Main Stadium.

Schedule
All times are Korea Standard Time (UTC+09:00)

Records

Results

1st round 
 Qualification: First 3 in each heat (Q) and the next 2 fastest (q) advance to the final.

Heat 1

Heat 2

Final

References

External links 
Results

Athletics at the 2002 Asian Games
2002